The 2014–15 Women's FIH Hockey World League was the second edition of women's field hockey national team league series. The tournament started in June 2014 in Singapore and finished in December 2015 in Rosario, Argentina.

The Semifinals of this competition also served as a qualifier for the 2016 Summer Olympics as 7 highest placed teams apart from the five continental champions qualified.

Argentina won the tournament's Final round for the first time after defeating New Zealand 5–1 in the final. Germany won the third place match by defeating China 6–2.

Qualification
Each national association member of the International Hockey Federation (FIH) had the opportunity to compete in the tournament, and after seeking entries to participate, 51 teams were announced to compete.

The 11 teams ranked between 1st and 11th in the FIH World Rankings current at early 2013 received an automatic bye to the Semifinals while the 8 teams ranked between 12th and 19th received an automatic bye to Round 2. Scotland would have qualified as the nineteenth ranked team but will compete as Great Britain as in every Olympic Qualifying Tournament, giving its berth to twentieth ranked Russia. Those nineteen teams, shown with qualifying rankings, were the following:

 (1)
 (2)
 (3)
 (4)
 (5)
 (6)
 (7)
 (8)
 (9)
 (10)
 (11)
 (12)
 (13)
 (14)
 (15)
 (16)
 (17)
 (18)
 (20)

Schedule

Round 1

Round 2

 – The Czech Republic withdrew from participating and Turkey took their place.

Semifinals

 – Azerbaijan withdrew from participating and France took their place.

Final

Final ranking

Reference:

Not specified

References

 
Women's FIH Hockey World League
2014 in women's field hockey
2015 in women's field hockey